BRD may refer to:

Places
 Brainerd Lakes Regional Airport (IATA Code BRD), Brainerd, Minnesota, US
 BRD Tower (disambiguation), name for two different office towers in Romania
 Federal Republic of Germany (since 1990)
 BRD (Germany), an unofficial German initialism for West Germany
 West Germany (Federal Republic of Germany 1949–1990), the historical country

Organizations
 Belfast Roller Derby, a women's roller derby league in Belfast, Northern Ireland
 BRD – Groupe Société Générale, a Romanian bank
 Bristol Roller Derby, a roller derby league in Bristol, England

Other uses
 Black Ribbon Day, a day of remembrance for victims of totalitarianism regimes
 BRD Trilogy, three films directed by Rainer Werner Fassbinder
 Book Review Digest, a reference work
 Bovine respiratory disease, a disease affecting beef cattle

See also
 BRD2, BRD3, BRD4 and BRDT, bromodomain families
 Business requirements document
 Bycatch reduction device, see Bycatch